Reachin' Back is the fourth studio album by American singer Regina Belle. It was released by Columbia Records on September 5, 1995, in the United States. A cover album of classic songs, it is dedicated to Philadelphia soul music. The album peaked at number 115 on the ZS Billboard 200 and number 18 on the Top R&B/Hip-Hop Albums. Its first and only single, "Love T.K.O.", peaked at number 29 on the Hot R&B/Hip-Hop Songs.

Critical reception

AllMusic editor Stephen Thomas Erlewine called Reachin' Back "a collection of 11 covers of classic R&B and soul songs, including numbers performed by Al Green and The Spinners. Since their definitive, original performances have become part of the public's collective consciousness, it's unfair to hold Belle's interpretations in comparison, since hers inevitably pale. Taken on their own terms, her versions are well-sung and well-produced, yet slightly uninspired. Fans might find it necessary, but Reachin Back doesn't rank among her most distinguished efforts."

Track listing

Charts

References

Regina Belle albums
1995 albums
Columbia Records albums
Covers albums